Kjerulfbreen (Kjerulf Glacier) is a glacier in Oscar II Land at Spitsbergen, Svalbard. It has a length of about 7.5 kilometers, and is debouching into the Trygghamna bay at the northern side of Isfjorden. The glacier is named after Norwegian geologist Theodor Kjerulf.

See also
List of glaciers in Svalbard

References

Glaciers of Spitsbergen